Un biglietto del tram is the fourth studio album by the Italian progressive rock band Stormy Six. It was released in 1975.

The climate in which it took the release of this disc (among other things one of the first "independent" outputs) is the years of lead and politicization of every aspect of life. In particular Stormy Six represent the official voice of the student movement in Milan (or what remains of it), by far the "group" most important challenge of '68 university. The "concept" of the work is related to the struggle for liberation from Nazi barbarism, all the songs have in fact descriptions of facts (or considerations) linked to guerrilla warfare. And this time was a "policy" or view the reaffirmation of an identity and a history without which no speech "left" is possible. So no chance of "revivalism".

Track listing
Side A
"Stalingrado" – 5:25
"La fabbrica" – 3:53
"Arrivano gli americani" – 5:55
"8 settembre" – 4:52
Side B
"Nuvole a Vinca" – 4:25
"Dante di Nanni" – 4:18
"Gianfranco Mattei" – 4:22
"La sepoltura dei morti" – 3:53
"Un biglietto del tram" – 5:42

Personnel
Franco Fabbri – guitar, vocals
Umberto Fiori – guitar, vocals
Carlo De Martini – saxophone, violin
Tommaso Leddi – violin, mandolin, balalajka, guitar
Luca Piscicelli – bass guitar, vocals
Antonio Zanuso – drums

Notes

External links

1975 albums
Stormy Six albums